Denton Township is a civil township of Roscommon County in the U.S. state of Michigan. The population was 5,557 at the 2010 census.

Communities
 Houghton Lake is located along the shores of Houghton Lake.  Houghton Lake is defined as an unincorporated community and census-designated place.  The Houghton Lake 48629 ZIP Code serves the western portion of the township.  The Houghton Lake CDP is mostly within neighboring Roscommon Township and further to Lake Township.
Prudenville  is an unincorporated community  and census-designated place located entirely within Denton Township along the southeast shores of Houghton Lake.  The Prudenville 48651 ZIP Code serves the majority of Denton Township.

Geography

Demographics
As of the census of 2000, there were 5,817 people, 2,649 households, and 1,817 families residing in the township. The racial makeup of the township was 98.21% White, 0.10% African American, 0.98% Native American, 0.05% Asian, 0.05% Pacific Islander, 0.05% from other races, and 0.55% from two or more races. Hispanic or Latino of any race were 0.79% of the population.

There were 2,649 households, out of which 22.0% had children under the age of 18 living with them, 56.3% were married couples living together, 8.5% had a female householder with no husband present, and 31.4% were non-families. 28.0% of all households were made up of individuals, and 14.0% had someone living alone who was 65 years of age or older.  The average household size was 2.19 and the average family size was 2.62.

In the township the population was spread out, with 19.4% under the age of 18, 6.2% from 18 to 24, 20.5% from 25 to 44, 29.9% from 45 to 64, and 24.0% who were 65 years of age or older.  The median age was 48 years. For every 100 females, there were 94.2 males.  For every 100 females age 18 and over, there were 91.5 males.

The median income for a household in the township was $29,397, and the median income for a family was $35,918. Males had a median income of $33,311 versus $20,957 for females. The per capita income for the township was $18,946.  About 8.4% of families and 10.2% of the population were below the poverty line, including 17.8% of those under age 18 and 6.2% of those age 65 or over.

References

External links
Denton Township official website

Townships in Roscommon County, Michigan
Townships in Michigan
1870 establishments in Michigan
Populated places established in 1870